John Andrew McCollum (born March 1, 1959) is an American football coach. He was the head coach of the Middle Tennessee Blue Raiders football program from 1999 to 2005. In 2023, McCollum was named head football coach at Sewanee: The University of the South.

Coaching career
McCollum was an assistant at Georgia Tech from 2010 to 2018. Head coach Paul Johnson retired at the end of the 2018 season. Incoming head coach Geoff Collins did not retain any of the former staff, although there was some thought McCollum's ability as a recruiter might lead to his retention.

McCollum returned to coaching in 2020 when Western Carolina hired him as defensive coordinator under head coach Mark Speir, replacing John Wiley.

Head coaching record

References

External links
 Sewanee profile
 Western Carolina profile

1959 births
Living people
American football offensive guards
American football tight ends
Austin Peay Governors football players
Baylor Bears football coaches
Georgia Tech Yellow Jackets football coaches
Middle Tennessee Blue Raiders football coaches
NC State Wolfpack football coaches
UTEP Miners football coaches
Sewanee Tigers football coaches
Western Carolina Catamounts football coaches